Pitlick is a surname. Notable people with the surname include:

Lance Pitlick (born 1967), American ice hockey player
Rem Pitlick (born 1997), Canadian-born American ice hockey player
Tyler Pitlick (born 1991), American ice hockey player